The , commonly called APA, was founded in 1958. It has held exhibitions since 1959 and publishes an annual survey of the most interesting photography.

Links and sources
 APA-Japan.com 
 Nihon shashinka jiten / 328 Outstanding Japanese Photographers). Kyoto: Tankōsha, 2000. 

Organizations established in 1958
Advertising organizations
Japanese photography organizations
Advertising in Japan
1958 establishments in Japan